The Kalispell Center Mall is a shopping mall located in Kalispell, Montana, United States. Its anchors are JCPenney and Red Lion Hotels with one vacant anchor last occupied by Herberger's. It also has a casino and a US Bank. It opened in 1986. In 2013, Red Lion Hotels Corporation sold the mall to WSPGB Mall LLC for $11.6 million. In 2014, Starbucks announced plans to open a shop at the mall. On April 18, 2018, it was announced that Herberger's would be closing as parent company The Bon-Ton Stores was going out of business. The store closed on August 29, 2018.

References

External links

Kalispell, Montana
Shopping malls in Montana
Shopping malls established in 1986
1986 establishments in Montana